Raigiri is a village of Bhuvanagiri mandal and also falls under Bhongir Municipality in Yadadri Bhuvanagiri district in the state of Telangana, India.

There is a railway station in this village between Secunderabad, Bhuvanagiri and Kazipet, Warangal under South Central Railway. This is the nearest station to reach the famous pilgrimage place Yadadri temple and Bhuvanagiri fort

Gallery

References

External links

Villages in Yadadri Bhuvanagiri district